Monica Nicholle Sandra Dewi Gunawan Basri (August 8, 1983) is an Indonesian model and actress. She is also a brand ambassador to Indonesian and South East Asian Products

Biography
Dewi was born in Pangkal Pinang, Bangka on August 8, 1983. She is an Indonesian top actress, model, brand ambassador, TV host and businesswoman. The oldest of three children born to Andreas Gunawan Basri and Chatarina Erliani, she is a Catholic of Chinese, Japanese and Palembang origin. After growing up in Pangkal Pinang and attending Catholic schools, she moved to Jakarta with her family in 2001 to attend the London School of Public Relations. Shortly afterwards, she won the Miss Enchanteur beauty contest and in 2002 was selected as Tourism Envoy for West Jakarta. She later participated in the Fun Fearless Female, sponsored by Cosmopolitan Indonesia, contest in 2006, in which she placed second.
Dewi achieved mainstream success with her role in the 2007 comedy Quickie Express, for which she received the 2008 Indonesian Movie Award for Best Newcomer. The following year, she collaborated with Dewi Sandra and Luna Maya on the song "Play", which was released for the UEFA Euro 2008, and she starred in Tarzan ke Kota, as well as singing some of the movie's songs.

Dewi has also acted in sinetron (Indonesian soap operas) and in several music videos. In Hidayah, she played a Muslim character. She also performed in the video clip for Mulan Jameela's 2008 single "Wonder Woman". She did so without pay, later saying that the experience made it more than worthwhile. She was later named "the most searched artist" by Yahoo! Indonesia.
She has described herself as still being a devout practicing Catholic.

Personal life

In November 2016, Sandra Dewi married businessman Harvey Moeis in Tokyo Disneyland. The couple have 2 sons.

Works
Sandra made her film debut in Quickie Express. This was followed by a successful soap opera Cinta Indah in 2008. She has received several awards and nominations for her acting. She has also appeared in Indonesian advertising campaigns for Clear, Pond's, Nokia, Aux Air Conditioner, Toyota, Yong Ma, Sharp, etc.

She is also the Director of Corporate Communication of PT Paramount Land, one of the biggest property companies in Indonesia.
She represented Indonesia in the 2018 'Super-Hair World Cup V' at the celebrity hairstyle website Super-Hair.Net, and won the championship in a tournament of online voting.

Movies
A Very Slow Breakfast (2002) 
Quickie Express (2007)
Tarzan ke Kota (Tarzan Goes to the City; 2008)
Langit Ke-7 (2012)
I Am Hope (2016)
Triangle the Dark Side (2016)

TV series
Cinta Indah (Beautiful Love; 2008)
Preman Kampus (Campus Thug)
Saya Jameela (I am Jameela; 2008)
Elang (Eagle; 2008)
Hidayah (Guidance)
Kejamnya Dunia (The World is Cruel)
Nurhaliza (2010)
Langit dan Bumi (Heaven and Earth; 2010)
Cahaya Cinta (The Light of Love)
Putri Bidadari (Princess Angel; 2012)
Tangan Tangan Mungil (Little Hands; 2013)
Kita Nikah Yuk (Let's Get Married; 2014)

References
Footnotes

Bibliography

External links

Living people
Indonesian Roman Catholics
Indonesian female models
Indonesian actresses
People from Pangkal Pinang
1983 births
Sundanese people
Indonesian people of Chinese descent